The Rakovica revolt was an armed uprising in 1871 led by Croatian politician Eugen Kvaternik against authorities of Austria-Hungary, with the aim of establishing an independent Croatian state at the time when it was part of Austria-Hungary. The uprising, named after the village of Rakovica in south-central Croatia where it started, lasted only four days in October 1871, and ended in defeat for Croatian rebels.

Revolt

Preparations
Eugen Kvaternik had planned to launch a rebellion years earlier against what was then the Austrian Empire since 1859. However, he failed to secure allies in either Italy or Hungary to participate in the cause.

Kvaternik planned a revolt without notifying anybody from Party of Rights, including its leader Ante Starčević. Kvaternik's idea was creation of an independent Croatian state, union of Croatian Military Frontier with provincial Croatia and their secession from Austria-Hungary. Kvaternik planned a revolt months before, already issuing a seal of a new Croatian state. The population of the Croatian Military Frontier did not support an unification with the Kingdom of Croatia following the Croatian-Hungarian Agreement, as Croatia was under Hungarian influence, while the Frontiers supported the ruling dynasty (Austria). This made conditions for the revolt much harder than Kvaternik expected.

Another bad condition for the revolution was its location; the village of Rakovica and the area of Kordun was mostly populated by Orthodox Serbs of Croatia. However, a large number of the local Orthodox population supported Kvaternik.

Conflict
Kvaternik gathered rebels in the village of Broćanac on October 7, 1871, and on the same day Kvaternik declared the Croatian People's Government and the rebels declared him president. Soon he gained supporters from the villages of Rakovica, Broćanac, Brezovac, Mašvina, Plavča Draga and Gornja Močila. Kvaternik's government also made a declaration where he represented equality before the law, municipal self-governing, the abolition of military administration in the Croatian Military Frontier and introduction of free counties. In order to get to the border with Bosnia Vilayet which was part of the Ottoman Empire at the time, the rebels concluded they needed to capture the village of Drežnik. Rakijaš advanced with 300 men into Drežnik, however, the population refused to join them, so Rakijaš returned to Rakovica.

On October 9, Kvaternik led the attack on Plaški, at which time the Austro-Hungarian Army reacted and sent Ogulin Regiment to deal with rebels, which upon arriving saw the majority of Kvaternik's 1700 rebels escaping. On October 10, Kvaternik's rebellion was crushed, and he was executed on October 11, along with Bach, Rakijaš and one of the Čuić brothers (the other one took refuge in Serbia).

Aftermath
The revolt ultimately failed. Immediately after rebellion, on 10 October, the Austrian government began the arrests. On November 11, the court sentenced seven participants to hanging, including Petar Ugarković, Petar Čuić, Marko Milošević, Janko Čuić, Ilija Šaša, Jozo Stregar and Petar Tepavac. Since there were no executioners available at that exact time, the convicts were shot the same day.

On October 14, Lazo Čuić, Filip Milanović, Petar Došen, Miladin Šaša were sentenced to death; Mladin Šaša's conviction was changed to 18 years in a dungeon.

During the night of October 12/13, all citizens with the Starčević surname were arrested. Among others arrested was Petar Vrdoljak who was sentenced to 12 years in a dungeon, Rudolf Fabijani who was later released, Franjo Turkalj and Milovan Miljković who were sentenced to 14 years in a dungeon, Maksim Ćurić who was sentenced to 8 years in a dungeon, Lazo Šaša who was sentenced 4 years in a dungeon, Mihael Bosnić, Petar Vojnović, Mihajlo Majnolović and Stjepan Đaković who were released.

On October 16, Franjo Rački informed Josip Juraj Strossmayer about one of Kvaternik's plans if the revolt would have been successful. In letters found with the corpses of Kvaternik and Bach, it was stated that they would eliminate Ivan Mažuranić (who led a friendly policy with Austria at the time), Matija Mrazović, Franjo Rački, Đuro Crnadak and Nikola Krešić.

Also, before the rebellion started, Austria was governed by the government of Karl Sigmund von Hohenwart. His government had planned to federalize Austria-Hungary into three major parts: Austrian, Hungarian and South Slavic (Croatian) parts. The Hungarian ruling elite was against such measures, namely Hungarian Prime Minister Gyula Andrássy who advocated Croatian subordination to Hungary. Andrássy represented Croats as opponents of the Franz Joseph's regime so he used Kvaternik's rebellion as an example, since Kvaternik had in mind to declare Croatia independent from Austro-Hungarian rule. This led to fall of Hohenwart's government and abandonment of federalism.

Monument
A statue of Kvaternik in Rakovica was unveiled in 1933. After World War II, it was removed by the communist authorities, but was later returned. The statue was removed and damaged by Serbian soldiers during the Croatian War of Independence, and was restored in 1996.

References

Literature
Horvat, Josip. "Graditelj Mažuranić [Builder Mažuranić]". In Židovec, Zdravko (in Croatian). Politička povijest Hrvatske [Political History of Croatia]. 1. Zagreb: ITRO Augustin Cesarec. .

Conflicts in 1871
1871 in Croatia
1870s in Hungary
1870s in Austria
19th-century rebellions
Rebellions in Croatia
Croatia under Habsburg rule
Rebellions against Austria-Hungary
History of Kordun
Kingdom of Croatia-Slavonia